Tornquist or Törnquist or Tørnquist is a surname of Swedish origin. The word tornquist means "thorn branch". See also the spelling Törnqvist.

Tornquist may refer to:

 Tornquist, Buenos Aires, a city in Buenos Aires Province, Argentina
 Tornquist Partido, a district in Buenos Aires Province, Argentina
 Tornquist Sea, a paleo-sea between Baltica and Avalonia during early Paleozoic time
 Tornquist line, Tornquist Zone, Tornquist Fan: suture features running through Europe from the North Sea to the Black Sea.

People with the surname
 Ernesto Tornquist (1842–1908), Argentine businessman
 Evie (singer) (born 1957) (Evie Karlsson, née Tornquist), American singer
 John Törnquist (1876–1937), Swedish missionary to Xinjiang
 Einar Tørnquist (born 1982), comedian, talkshow host, and drummer
 Ragnar Tørnquist (born 1970), game designer
 Steffo Törnquist (born 1956), Swedish journalist
 Kristine Tornquist (born 1965), Austrian artist and stage director, work includes Šimon Voseček's Hybris

Swedish-language surnames